Songs From the North I, II & III is the sixth studio album by Finnish extreme metal band Swallow the Sun. It is a triple album and was released on 13 November 2015, via Century Media. Each disc is focused on a different facet of the band's style: Gloom is a more typical death/doom album, Beauty primarily acoustic and folksy, and Despair a funeral doom album; these disc titles are also a single song title on their second album, Ghosts of Loss. This is the last release with Aleksi Munter and Markus Jämsen, who quit Swallow the Sun in 2016 and 2018 respectively. Songs From the North I, II & III received a generally positive reception from critics.

Track listing

Reception

Credits

Swallow the Sun
Mikko Kotamäki - lead vocals 
Markus Jämsen - lead guitar 
Juha Raivio - rhythm guitar; all songwriting, guitar recording, mixing (I Gloom)
Matti Honkonen - bass guitar
Aleksi Munter - keyboards; recording, art direction, layout, photography
Juuso Raatikainen - drums

Additional Vocalists
Aleah Stanbridge - co-vocals (Heartstrings Shattering) also cover art and photography
Sarah Elisabeth Wohlfahrt - backing vocals (The Memory of Light and Lost & Catatonic)
Kaisa Vala - co-vocals (Songs from the North) 
Nathan Ellis -	narration (Empires of Loneliness)

Recording Staff
Tuomas Kokko - also mixing (II Beauty)
Hiili Hiilesmaa - also mixing (III Despair)
Hannu Honkonen - recording assistance

Band Photography
Alexandra Lisiecki
Antti Makkonen
Jussi Ratilainen
Indrek Päri

Vocal Recording
Kaisa Vala 
Pietari Pyykönen
Birger Nießen - recording of Sarah Elisabeth Wohlfahrt's Vocals

Mastering Staff
Patrick W. Engel - vinyl mastering 
Svante Forsbäck - CD mastering

Additional Personnel
Jaani Peuhu - vocal production, mixing (II Beauty) and backing vocals
Rami Mursula - artwork and logo

References

External links
 

2015 albums
Swallow the Sun albums
Century Media Records albums